Hugo Björklund (23 November 1885 – May 1963) was a Swedish wrestler. He competed in the lightweight event at the 1912 Summer Olympics.

References

External links

1885 births
1963 deaths
Olympic wrestlers of Sweden
Wrestlers at the 1912 Summer Olympics
Swedish male sport wrestlers
People from Nyköping Municipality
Sportspeople from Södermanland County